The Belgrade Blue Dragons are an American football team from Belgrade, Serbia.

History 
Blue Dragons was founded in July 2003 in Belgrade. Together with six other clubs, they founded the Association of American Football of Serbia.

We played our first game at the beginning of November 2003, just a month after the first training session, and we won our first game in December of the same year against the team from Novi Sad.

However, like all teams in Serbia, the Dragons played American football without protective equipment (helmets and pads) until the 2007 season. A year before 2007, the Dragons merged with the only varsity team in Serbia, the Electricians. In the same season, the Dragons were the first team in Group A of the national championship, eventually reaching the semi-finals. The defeat in the semi-final came against the city rivals (Vukovi Belgrade) after 3 overtimes.

In the 2008 season, the senior team had no notable success while our junior team reached the finals.

In the 2009 season, we reached the finals of the national league, we played in the EFAF Cup, and our junior team won the championship title.

In the 2010 season, we reached the semi-finals of the national league and participated in the EUROBOWL competition.

Apart from the domestic championship (SAAF Sportklub Superliga Serbia) in 2011, in which we won fifth place, we also played in the Central-Eastern European Interleague, in which we recorded third place.

In 2012 and 2013, we were semi-finalists of the SAAF Sportklub Superliga of Serbia, while in 2013 we were also vice-champions of the CEFL Cup.

The 2014 season was probably the worst in the Dragons' history - in addition to the domestic championship, we are again playing in the Central-Eastern European Interleague. Unfortunately, for the first time in the history of the club, after recording only two victories for the whole season, we are relegated to the lower rank of the competition.

In the 2015 season, the Dragons play in the Second League of Serbia and we return to the Super League without a single defeat. In addition to the domestic competition, our team also plays in the Alpe Adria league with teams from the former YU republics.

In 2016, after returning to the SAAF Sportklub First League of Serbia, we returned to our old ways and once again reached the semi-finals of the championship.

In the 2017 season, we again reach the semi-finals of the domestic championship, but we also take part in the CEFL Cup competition for the second time. In the match for third place, away from home, we beat Spartans from Sarajevo.

In 2018 and 2019, the Dragons reached the semi-finals of the domestic Championship for the sixth and seventh time.

In 2020, the entire world was hit by the pandemic of the COVID-19 virus, so instead of the regular season, a non-contact version (touch football) was played.

After permission to play the regular season in the years 2021 and 2022, we reach the semi-finals of the domestic championship and for the first time, that is. we win the Balkan League for the second time.

The Dragons currently compete in several categories within the SAAF leagues. Senior tackle team, senior men's and women's flag teams, as well as under-13 and under-15 flag teams.

Currently, around 80 players compete in Zmajevi in all categories.

Since its inception, the club has been represented by more than 500 people.

History 
 2003 (1 W - 1 L)
 2004 4 City Cup runners-up (3 W - 2 L)
 2005 SAFS Cup - 7th place (1 W - 1 L)
 2006 (1 W - 1 L)
 2007 SAFS National League runners-up, SAFS Super National league semi-final, 4th team in Serbia (6 W-5 L)
 2008 (3 W - 4 L)
 2009 (6 W - 5 L) SAFS NLS runners-up, SAFS vice-champions, EFAF Cup contenders, Champions of Junior League SAFS JLS
 2010 (4 W - 3 L) SAFS NLS runners-up, Eurobowl contenders
 2011 (3 W - 4 L) 5th place in SAAF Superleague 
 2012 (3 W - 4 L) SAAF NLS runners-up
 2013 (3 W - 4 L) SAAF NLS runners-up
 2014 (1 W - 6 L) SAAF NLS 6th place, moving to 2nd Division 3rd place in CEI Interleague
 2015 (6 W - O L) SAAF runners-up, champions of 2nd Division 4th place in ALPE Adria League
 2016 (3W-4L) SAAF Superleague 5th place
 2017 (4W-3L) SAAF Superleague runners-up, CEFL Cup 3rd place
 2018 (4W-3L) SAAF Superleague runners-up
 2019 (4W-3L) SAAF Superleague runners-up

Roster 
For 2021 SAAF Serbian First League for Blue Dragons played the following players:

Interesting 
 They played 4 years without pads and helmets, and in their first season with equipment they were 4th in Serbia

External links 
 

American football teams in Serbia
2003 establishments in Serbia
American football teams established in 2003